Pair of   Kings is an American television sitcom that premiered on the Disney XD cable channel on September 10, 2010. This list of episodes is organized by premiere date in the US. The series revolves around a pair of hapless Chicagoan teens (Mitchel Musso, Doc Shaw) who are the heirs to the throne of a fictitious Pacific island called Kinkow. In the third and final season one of the brothers leaves the show (Mitchel Musso) replaced by Boz (Adam Hicks), a long lost brother of the original two, that was raised by monkeys.

Series overview

Episodes

Season 1 (2010–11)

Season 2 (2011–12)

Season 3 (2012–13)
 On December 12, 2011, Disney XD announced that Pair of Kings had been renewed for a third season with actor Adam Hicks to join the cast, replacing Mitchel Musso. This is also the last season for the series.

References

General references 
 
 
 
 

Lists of Disney Channel television series episodes
Lists of American children's television series episodes
Lists of American sitcom episodes